Kanō Naganobu (1577 – 26 December 1654) was a Japanese painter of the Kanō school.

Naganobu was the youngest brother of the Kanō school's head, Kanō Eitoku.  Naganobu completed numerous commissions for the court in Kyoto, including at the Imperial Palace, and started his own line of the Kanō school.  He was the first major Kanō painter to move from Kyoto to Edo (modern Tokyo) as the Tokugawa shogunate consolidated control of the country and set up its government there.  Naganobu is speculated to have made the move before Tokugawa Ieyasu's death in 1615, possibly as early as 1605, and may have worked first at Ieyasu's castle in Sunpu Domain (in modern Shizuoka).  His workshop in Edo officially served the Tokugawa shogunate under the title .

Notes
Naganobu, Kano, 1775-1828

References

Works cited

External links
 

1577 births
1654 deaths
16th-century Japanese people
17th-century Japanese people
17th-century Japanese artists
17th-century Japanese painters
Kanō school